Harry Booth may refer to:

Harry Booth (coach) (1941–2022), American college baseball and basketball coach
Harry Booth (criminal) or Terence Hogan (1931–1995), English professional criminal
Harry Booth (filmmaker), English filmmaker
Harry Booth (rugby league), English rugby league footballer of the 1910s and 1920s
Harry Booth, fictional character in the 1979 film The Black Hole

See also
Henry Booth (disambiguation)
Harold Booth (disambiguation)